South Fourth Street Commercial Historic District is a national historic district located at St. Joseph, Missouri. The district encompasses 25 contributing buildings in an industrial/commercial section of St. Joseph west of the central business district. It developed between about 1861 and 1929, and includes representative examples of Italianate, Classical Revival, and Renaissance Revival style architecture. Notable buildings include a number of commercial blocks and warehouse/light manufacturing facilities some of which were designed by architect Edmond Jacques Eckel (1845–1934).

It was listed on the National Register of Historic Places in 1991.

References

Historic districts on the National Register of Historic Places in Missouri
Italianate architecture in Missouri
Renaissance Revival architecture in Missouri
Neoclassical architecture in Missouri
Historic districts in St. Joseph, Missouri
National Register of Historic Places in Buchanan County, Missouri